Trevor Quow (born 28 September 1960) is an English former professional footballer who played as a midfielder. He played in the Football League for Gillingham, Peterborough United and Northampton Town, and in the Conference for Kettering Town. He also played non-league football for Sudbury Town, Stamford and Boston United, and for several clubs in Hong Kong.

References

External links
 

1960 births
Living people
Sportspeople from Peterborough
English footballers
Association football midfielders
Peterborough United F.C. players
Gillingham F.C. players
Northampton Town F.C. players
Kettering Town F.C. players
Boston United F.C. players
Double Flower FA players
Hong Kong Rangers FC players
Sudbury Town F.C. players
Stamford A.F.C. players
Ely City F.C. players
English Football League players
National League (English football) players
Hong Kong First Division League players
Southern Football League players